The 1905 United States Senate election in Massachusetts was held during January 1905. Republican incumbent Henry Cabot Lodge won election to a third term.

At the time, Massachusetts elected United States senators by a majority vote of the combined houses of the Massachusetts General Court.

Background
In the 1904 legislative elections, Republican maintained an overwhelming majority. The Senators-elect included 34 Republicans and just six Democrats, and the Representatives-elect included 164 Republicans and 66 Democrats.

Nominating caucuses
Lodge faced no opposition for the Republican nomination. At the caucus on January 12, his name was placed into nomination by Senate President William F. Dana, and seconding speeches were made by Speaker of the House William F. Frothingham and Representative William Salter.

Results
Lodge was re-elected on a party-line vote.

References

1905
Massachusetts
United States Senate